The Parramatta Australian Football Club is an Australian rules football club based in the Western Suburbs of Sydney, Australia. The club colours are blue and yellow and they are nicknamed the Goannas. They currently have five teams: Men's Platinum Division, Platinum Reserves, & Under 19s; and Women's Division 1 and Division 2. All teams play in the Sydney AFL league.

The Goannas home ground is Gipps Road Oval located in the western Sydney suburb of Greystanes, part of the local city of Holroyd.

History
The club formed in 1979 (reserves only) as Parramatta with a senior team instigated in 1980. The club changed its name to Holroyd-Parramatta in 1983 before a merger with Blacktown in 1995. In 2020, the team changed its name to Parramatta Goannas.

In 1985, six years after their formation, the Goannas were admitted to Sydney football's primary competition, the SFL (now known as Premier League), where, after a lack lustre couple of seasons, they began to emerge as a genuine force towards the end of the decade. With former Richmond player Ron Thomas at the helm the side qualified for the 1990 finals in second spot behind North Shore before winning the second semi final by 31 points. In the grand final a fortnight later it again met North Shore and, in a spiteful, tempestuous match at the Erskineville Oval, won its first and only SFL pennant by 7 points. Final scores were Holroyd-Parramatta 9.15 (69) defeated North Shore 9.8 (62), with Brian ‘Alf' Hawke courageously seeing out the entire game for the victors despite sustaining a broken jaw early on. The Goannas retained the nucleus of their premiership side in 1991, but on this occasion fell at the final hurdle. The premiership team included future Sydney Swan player Neil Brunton. The premiership decider featured the same teams as in 1990 and was, if anything, an even more bruising and unpleasant encounter, with the Goannas, despite having only fifteen fit men, doing well to get within a goal during the last term before ultimately going down by 22 points.

In 1995, the club decided that it was being over-stretched in the SFL, and took the opportunity of merging with struggling SFA club, Blacktown. In 1995, the club decided that it was being over-stretched in the SFL, and took the opportunity of merging with struggling SFA club, Blacktown.  The newly merged club would compete in the SFA, the highlight of this period being a 14.10 (94) to 11.11 (77) grand final defeat of Wollongong in 2001.

in 2018, the Goannas became home to its inaugural women's team in AFL Sydney's Women's Division 2 competition. The ladies of 2018 went on to win the flag that year in a comprehensive 7.8.50-1.5.11 win over Camden Cats - a quickly established rivalry that still exists. In 2019, the Goannas ladies expanded to include a new Division 3 team as the 2018 premiers were promoted to Division 1. After finishing Minor Premiers, Division 2 went down in a hard-fought battle against the St George Dragons in the grand final. 2020 was the Goannas ladies most dominant year finishing Minor Premiers after an unbeaten season and a hard-to-believe winning percentage of 817.65%. Continuing the rivalry against Camden Cats, the Goannas won the Grand Final 4.10 (34) - 0.1 (1) to finish 2020 Division 1 Premiers.

Arguably the Goannas' most famous player was Mark Taylor (cricketer), who won the club's best and fairest award in 1983, and later went on to captain the Australian Test cricket team. Taylor is the current club patron of the Goannas.

Hall of fame
 David Barwick
 Peter "Bear" Rickett
 Peter "PT" Taylor

Life Members

 Ken Gray 
 Julie Gray 
 Terry Kennedy 
 Robert Mannion 
 David Barwick 
 Peter Taylor 
 Peter Rickett 
 Robert Murphy 
 Ron Goulding 
 Stuart Hall 
 Harold Wilson 
 Nick Grant 
 Don Cardilini 
 Sue Cardilini 
 John Perry 
 Troy Balzan 
 Patrick Gallagher (jnr) 
 Graeme Huxley 
 Tony Mance 
 Al Fennell
 Clive Sharp
 Justin Cunneen

Premierships
 Sydney Football League (now Premier Division) - 1990
 Sydney Football League Reserve Grade - 1991
 Sydney Football Association First Grade - 2001
 Sydney Football Association Under 20 - 1984, 1991
 Sydney Football League Women's Div 2 - 2018
 Sydney Football League Under 19 Div 2 - 2019
 Sydney Football League Women's Div 1 - 2020

Best & Fairest First Grade - Gray Medal 
2013 saw the inaugural presentation of the Gray Medal for the Goannas Best & Fairest winner. The Gray medal is named in honour of the Gray Family who have sponsored the Parramatta Football Club since its inception in 1979.

 1980 Dean Nelson
 1981 David Barwick 
 1982 Mark Taylor (cricketer)
 1983 Paul Screigh 
 1984 Peter Rickett 
 1985 Peter Rickett 
 1986 Peter Rickett 
 1987 Barry Denton 
 1988 Barry Denton 
 1989 Jason Lanham 
 1990 Neil Brunton
 1991 Michael Partridge 
 1992 Jason Lanham 
 1993 Damien Pearce 
 1994 Dwayne Finch 
 1995 Pat Gallagher 
 1996 Mark Iveli 
 1997 Brendan Connelly 
 1998 Brad Marshall 
 1999 Matthew Bell 
 2000 David Caminiti 
 2001 Pat Gallagher 
 2002 Pat Gallagher 
 2003 Pat Gallagher 
 2004 Pat Gallagher 
 2005 Daryn Avery & Glen Page 
 2006 Andrew Munns 
 2007 Alexander Beckton 
 2008 Gregory Adams 
 2009 Sireli Fifita 
 2010 Andrew Munns
 2011 Craig Geddes
 2012 Stuart McKinley
 2013 Jordan Pidgeon
 2014 Ben Rogers
 2015 Arin Rickett
 2016 Ryan Terry
 2017 Jordan Pidgeon
 2018 Arin Rickett
 2019 Jordan Pidgeon

League medallists

 Hart Medal (SFA Under 20s) - Mark Turner (1984)
 Phelan medal (SFL Seniors) - Michael Porta (1989)
 Sanders Medal (SFL Reserves) - Robert Ash (1989)
 Sanders Medal (SFL Reserves) - David Barwick (1990)
 Sanders Medal (SFL Reserves) - Peter Taylor (1991)
 Kealey Medal (SFL Under 19s) - Salem Kassem (1990)
 Snow Medal (SFA Seniors) - Salem Kassem (2000)
 McFarlene Medal (SFA Reserves) - Hakan Kassem (2000)
 Leading Goalkicker (Men’s Div 1) - Benjamin Rogers (2013)
 Leading Goalkicker (Men’s Div 1) - Benjamin Rogers (2014)
 Hart Medal (U19’s Div 2) - Reece Morris & Mitchell Sapiatizer (2015)
 Leading Goalkicker (U19’s Div 2) - Marcus Pasfield (2015)
 Leading Goalkicker (Men’s Div 5) - Nathan Peters (2015)
 Leading Goalkicker (Men’s Div 1) - Luke Jarjoura (2016)
 McFarlene Medal (Platinum Reserves) - Marcus Pasfield (2020)
 James Medal Winner (Women's Div 1) - Annaleise Barton (2020)
 Leading Goalkicker (Women's Div 1) - Maddi Finch (2020)
 Leading Goalkicker (Platinum Reserves) - Marcus Pasfield (2020)

External links
 
 fullpointsfooty.net

Australian rules football clubs in Sydney
1979 establishments in Australia
Australian rules football clubs established in 1979
Sport in Parramatta